Bedok South MRT station is a future underground Mass Rapid Transit station on the Thomson–East Coast line in Bedok planning area, Singapore.

The station will be located next to Temasek Secondary School, at the intersection of Upper East Coast Road and Bedok South Road.

History
On 15 August 2014, LTA announced that Bedok South station would be part of the proposed Thomson–East Coast line (TEL). The station will be constructed as part of Stage 5, consisting of 2 stations between Bedok South and Sungei Bedok, and is expected to be completed in 2025.

Contract T311 for the design and construction of Bedok South Station and associated tunnels was awarded to China Jingye Engineering Corporation Limited (Singapore Branch) at a sum of S$188 million in April 2016. Construction started in 2016.

Stage 5 of the TEL is now slated to commence passenger service in 2025 instead of 2024 due to the COVID-19 pandemic.

References

Proposed railway stations in Singapore
Mass Rapid Transit (Singapore) stations
Railway stations scheduled to open in 2025